KotoriCon was an annual two-day anime convention held during January at Rowan College at Gloucester County (formerly known as Gloucester County College) in Sewell, New Jersey. It was sponsored by the college's Japanese Anime Guild and KotoriCon's name came from the Japanese for little bird, inspired by the colleges roadrunner mascot. The convention was designed to be family-friendly. The convention ran its final event in 2020.

Programming
The convention typically offered anime music videos contest, artists' alley, charity auction, comedians, cosplay events, dealers' rooms, Jedi events, karaoke, live performances, martial arts demonstrations, panels, and video game tournaments.

Charity
Proceeds from the 2011 convention went to the Doctors Without Borders and Child's Play charity. In 2012 the charity auction benefited Direct Relief International and the Lauren Rose Foundation. Proceeds from the convention in 2012 resulted in a $700 donation to Mothers Matters. Charities the 2013 convention benefited were Hurricane Sandy victims and Liberty in North Korea (LiNK). The 2014 charity auction benefited The AbleGamers Foundation, a North Korean human-rights group, and others. The 2015 charities that KotoriCon supported were Able Gamers, Doctors Without Borders, Liberty in North Korea, and Pets for Vets. 2017's charities included Child's Play, Doctors without Borders, Indochinese-American Council, KotoriCon Endowment, Liberty in North Korea, Pets for Vets, and Seabrook Buddhist Temple. KotoriCon's 2019 charities included the Cystic Fibrosis Foundation, Fisher House Foundation, KotoriCon Scholarship Endowment, Liberty in North Korea, Seabrook Buddhist Temple, and Samaritan's Purse.

History
The convention in 2010 started under the name Gloucester County Anime Convention. Video gaming was held in the cafeteria on Friday night in 2011. The convention was spread out among three buildings on the Gloucester County College campus including the Fine Arts Center, College Center, and The Instructional Center. The third KotoriCon was in two locations, Pitman High School and Gloucester County College; in the first location, a concert by Eyeshine took place on January 6, 2012. The 2019 convention had a ticket limit of 1,500 attendees.

Event history

See also

 List of anime conventions
 List of festivals in New Jersey

References

External links

 Kotoricon official website

Defunct anime conventions
Festivals in New Jersey
Recurring events established in 2010
2010 establishments in New Jersey
Annual events in New Jersey
Tourist attractions in Gloucester County, New Jersey
Conventions in New Jersey